The following lists events that happened during 2015 in New Zealand.

Population
National
Estimated populations as at 30 June.
 New Zealand total – 4,596,700
 North Island – 3,519,800
 South Island – 1,076,300

Main urban areas
Estimated populations as at 30 June.

Auckland – 1,454,300
Blenheim – 30,600
Christchurch – 381,800
Dunedin – 117,400
Gisborne – 35,700
Hamilton – 224,000
Invercargill – 50,300
Kapiti – 41,300
Napier-Hastings – 129,700
Nelson – 64,800
New Plymouth – 56,300
Palmerston North – 83,500
Rotorua – 56,800
Tauranga – 130,800
Wellington – 398,300
Whanganui – 39,400
Whangārei – 55,400

Incumbents

Regal and vice-regal
Head of State – Elizabeth II
Governor-General – Jerry Mateparae

Government
2015 is the first full year of the 51st Parliament, which first sat on 21 October 2014.

The Fifth National Government, first elected in 2008, continues.

Speaker of the House – David Carter
Prime Minister – John Key
Deputy Prime Minister – Bill English
 Leader of the House – Gerry Brownlee
Minister of Finance – Bill English
Minister of Foreign Affairs – Murray McCully

Other party leaders
Labour – Andrew Little
Green  – Russel Norman until 30 May then James Shaw, and Metiria Turei
New Zealand First – Winston Peters
Māori Party  – Te Ururoa Flavell and Marama Fox
ACT New Zealand – David Seymour
United Future – Peter Dunne

Judiciary
Chief Justice — Sian Elias

Main centre leaders
Mayor of Auckland – Len Brown
Mayor of Tauranga – Stuart Crosby
Mayor of Hamilton – Julie Hardaker
Mayor of Wellington – Celia Wade-Brown
Mayor of Christchurch – Lianne Dalziel
Mayor of Dunedin – Dave Cull

Arts and literature

Performing arts

Benny Award presented by the Variety Artists Club of New Zealand to Johnny Devlin.

Events

January
 1 January – New Zealand begins its two-year term as a non-permanent member of the United Nations Security Council, after being elected on the first ballot in the 2014 election.

February
 14 February – The 2015 Cricket World Cup, jointly hosted between Australia and New Zealand, began in Christchurch with New Zealand winning against Sri Lanka

March
 16 March – The remnants of Cyclone Pam move down the east coast of New Zealand causing evacuations, heavy flooding, and power outages.
 28 March – A by-election was held in the Northland electorate to replace MP Mike Sabin of the National Party who resigned on 30 January. The electorate was regarded as a safe National seat, but was won by Winston Peters of New Zealand First.

April

May

June

July

August

September
A temporary ban on the 2013 book Into the River creates controversy.
1 September – The Flag Consideration Panel releases the short list of flag options

October

November

December

11 December – Voting closes on the first referendum on the New Zealand flag closes, with the black and blue variant of the Lockwood silver fern flag advancing to the second referendum.

Holidays and observances
 6 February – Waitangi Day
 25 April – Anzac Day
 27 April –  Anzac Day public holiday
 1 June – Queen's Birthday Monday
 26 October – Labour Day
 25 December – Christmas Day

Sport

Awards
 Halberg Awards
 Supreme Award – All Blacks (rugby)
 Sportsman – Kane Williamson (cricket)
 Sportswoman – Lydia Ko (golf)
 Team – All Blacks (rugby)
 Disabled Sportsperson – Sophie Pascoe (swimming)
 Coach – Steve Hansen (rugby)
 Emerging Talent – Eliza McCartney (athletics)

Basketball

Cricket

New Zealand, in conjunction with Australia, will host the 2015 Cricket World Cup between 14 February and 29 March.

Football
New Zealand will host the 2015 FIFA U-20 World Cup between 30 May and 20 June.

Rowing
New Zealand Secondary School Championships (Maadi Cup)
 Maadi Cup (boys U18 coxed eight) – Hamilton Boys' High School
 Levin 75th Jubilee Cup (girls U18 coxed eight) – St Margaret's College
 Star Trophy (overall points) – Hamilton Boys' High School

Shooting
Ballinger Belt – Ross Geange (Otorohanga)

Births
 12 October – Verry Elleegant, Thoroughbred racehorse
 26 October – Self Assured, Standardbred racehorse
 3 November – Kolding, Thoroughbred racehorse

Deaths

January
 10 January – John Angus, children's rights advocate (born 1948)
 11 January
 Doriemus, thoroughbred racehorse (foaled 1990)
 Chic Littlewood, television personality and actor (born 1930)
 13 January – Tony Ciprian, television sports news presenter and producer (born 1932)
 15 January – Harvey Sweetman, air force pilot (born 1921)
 16 January – Sir Ian Athfield, architect (born 1940)
 20 January – Lawrence Hogben, World War II naval officer, meteorologist (born 1916)
 29 January – Len Wyatt, cricketer (born 1919)

February
 1 February – Alby Duckmanton, cricket player and administrator (born 1933)
 9 February – Apirana Mahuika, Ngāti Porou leader (born 1934)
 11 February – Tama Huata, Māori performing arts leader (born 1950)
 12 February – Christopher Horton, businessman (born 1938)
 13 February – Kete Ioane, Cook Islands politician (born 1950)
 16 February
 Robin Duff, teacher, education leader, gay rights activist (born 1947)
 Celia Lashlie, prison officer, social justice advocate (born 1953)
 18 February – Doug Armstrong, cricketer, television sports presenter, politician (born 1931)
 24 February
 Dame Thea Muldoon, wife of Sir Robert Muldoon (born 1927)
 Tony Small, diplomat (born 1930)

March
 3 March – 
 Kerry Ashby, rower (born 1928)
 Peter Yaxley, rugby league player, referee and administrator (born 1928)
 7 March – Brian Sutton-Smith, writer and play theorist (born 1924)
 11 March – Keith Roberts, rugby league player (born 1932)
 12 March – Alan Wilkinson, association footballer (born 1924)
 14 March – Graham Avery, track cyclist (born 1929)
 18 March – Sir Don Rowlands, rower and businessman (born 1926)
 20 March – Sir Russell Pettigrew, businessman, sports administrator (born 1920)
 24 March
 Bryan Bartley, engineer (born 1928)
 Peter Stichbury, potter (born 1924)
 27 March – Neville Denton, rugby league player (born 1934)
 29 March – Mike Watt, sport shooter (born 1936)
 31 March – Trevor Laurence, field hockey player (born 1952)

April
 1 April – Sir John Ingram, engineer and businessman (born 1924)
 2 April
 Mick Brown, jurist (born 1937)
 Bill Lean, Paralympic athlete (born 1941)
 5 April – Steve Rickard, professional wrestler (born 1929)
 10 April
 Desmond Digby, stage designer, children's book illustrator and painter (born 1933)
 Dorothy Jelicich, politician (born 1928)
 16 April – Ron Bailey, politician (born 1926)
 18 April – Bill Schultz, rugby league player (born 1938)
 20 April – Gary Brain, timpanist and orchestral conductor (born 1943)
 23 April – Frana Cardno, politician (born 1941)

May
 2 May – Rex Percy, rugby league player (born 1934)
 8 May – 
 Juan Schwanner, association football player and manager (born 1921)
 Phil Skoglund, lawn bowls player (born 1937)
 9 May – Buddy Corlett, softball and basketball player (born 1921)
 10 May – Jack Body, composer (born 1944)
 19 May – Sir Thomas Gault, jurist (born 1938)
 21 May – Roland Avery, rugby league referee (born 1927)
 26 May – John Pinder, comedy producer and festival director (born 1945)
 29 May – Chris Kohlhase, softball player and coach (born 1967)
 31 May – Iain Campbell, cricketer (born 1928)

June
 5 June
 Jerry Collins, rugby union player (born 1980)
 Te Uruhina McGarvey, Tūhoe kuia (born 1927)
 Lecretia Seales, lawyer and right to die campaigner (born 1973)
 7 June – Peter Petherick, cricketer (born 1942)
 9 June – Sir Peter Williams, lawyer and penal reform advocate (born 1934)
 10 June – Bonecrusher, Thoroughbred racehorse (foaled 1982)
 13 June – Mike Shrimpton, cricket player and coach (born 1940)
 17 June – John Lasher, rugby league player
 18 June – Sir Patrick Moore, otolaryngologist (born 1918)
 20 June – Ian Bradley, naval officer and politician (born 1937)
 22 June – Norm Berryman, rugby union player (born 1973)
 25 June – Ross Hynds, Paralympic athlete (born 1947)
 27 June – Eric Dunn, cricketer (born 1929)

July
 2 July – Sir Ronald Davison, jurist, Chief Justice (1978–89) (born 1920)
 7 July – Craig Norgate, accountant and business leader (born 1965)
 13 July
 Sir John Buchanan, scientist and businessman (born 1943)
 Campbell Smith, wood engraver, playwright and poet (born 1925)
 18 July
 Tim Beaglehole, historian and university administrator (born 1933)
 Lou Gardiner, military officer, Chief of Army (2006–09) (born 1952)
 20 July – Stuart Jones, cricketer (born 1929)
 23 July – Doug Rowe, musician and singer (born 1945)
 27 July – Joan Mattingley, clinical chemist (born 1926)
 29 July – Sir John Todd, businessman and philanthropist (born 1927)
 30 July – Jimmy Edwards, rugby league player (born 1926)

August
 4 August – Les Munro, World War II pilot, last survivor of Operation Chastise (born 1919)
 6 August – Geoff Mardon, speedway rider (born 1927)
 7 August – Trevor Barber, cricketer (born 1925)
 9 August – Gordon Vette, pilot, TE-901 crash researcher (born 1933) 
 16 August – Jon Craig, architect (born 1942)
 17 August – George Gair, politician and diplomat (born 1926)
 20 August – Paul Kibblewhite, pulp and paper scientist (born 1941)
 21 August – Colin Beyer, lawyer and businessman (born 1938)
 28 August – Jan Anderson, plant biologist
 30 August – John Hotop, rugby union player (born 1929)

September
 2 September
 Avinash Deobhakta, lawyer and jurist (born 1936)
 Manos Nathan, ceramicist (born 1948)
 4 September – Graham Brazier, musician and songwriter (born 1952)
 6 September – Allen Roberts, cricketer (born 1922)
 8 September – Robert Wylie, cricketer (born 1948)
 10 September – Colleen Waata-Urlich, ceramicist (born 1939)
 13 September – Sir James Belich, politician, Mayor of Wellington (1986–92) (born 1927)
 15 September – Ian Uttley, rugby union player (born 1941)
 16 September
 Terry McCavana, association footballer (born 1922)
 Peter Molan, biochemist (born 1943)
 Bill Oliver, historian and poet (born 1925)
 17 September – Daniel Keighley, music festival promoter and band manager (born 1953)
 20 September – Dorothy Butler, children's author, bookseller and reading advocate (born 1925)
 25 September – Zabeel, Thoroughbred racehorse and sire (foaled 1986)
 30 September – Neil Graham, businessman and philanthropist (born 1943)

October
 3 October – William Taylor, children's writer and politician (born 1938)
 5 October – Michael Dean, television presenter (born 1933)
 6 October – Frankie Boardman, musician (born 1933)
 7 October – Arthur Woods, rugby union player (born 1929)
 9 October – David Benney, applied mathematician (born 1930)
 20 October – Sir John Scott, medical researcher (born 1931)
 29 October – Bruce Gregory, politician (born 1937)
 31 October – Colin Nicholson, lawyer and jurist (born 1938)

November
 1 November – Bill Ballantine, marine biologist (born 1937)
 10 November – Laurent Vidal, French triathlete who lived half the time in New Zealand (fiancé of Andrea Hewitt) (born 1984)
 12 November – Peter McLeavey, art dealer (born 1936)
 13 November – John Gray, Anglican bishop (born 1947)
 17 November – Donald Brian, cricketer (born 1925)
 18 November – Jonah Lomu, rugby union player (born 1975)
 19 November 
 Rex Cunningham, rugby league player (born 1924)
 John Hall-Jones, historian, otolaryngologist and outdoorsman (born 1927)
 21 November – Vern Bakalich, rugby league player (born 1929)
 30 November
 Jack Fagan, rugby league player (born 1933)
 David Simmons, ethnologist and historian (born 1930)

December
 3 December – Michael Wilson, cricketer (born 1940)
 7 December – Betty Bourke, health administrator (born 1924)
 10 December – Maurice Graham, rugby union player (born 1931)
 12 December – Jon Gadsby, writer and comedian (born 1953)
 19 December – Stephen Jelicich, architect and historian (born 1923)
 23 December – Bill Subritzky, property developer and evangelist (born 1925)

See also 
2015 in New Zealand television
List of years in New Zealand
Timeline of New Zealand history
History of New Zealand
Military history of New Zealand
Timeline of the New Zealand environment
Timeline of New Zealand's links with Antarctica

References

 
New Zealand
2010s in New Zealand
Years of the 21st century in New Zealand
New Zealand